The discography of Kate Ryan, a Belgian World Music Award winner, consists of five studio albums, two Compilation albums and twenty two singles.

Signed by EMI Belgium, Ryan released her debut album in 2002 Different, which contains singles "Désenchantée" and "Libertine" (both covers of Mylène Farmer's songs) and Mon cœur résiste encore, French version of her first single "Scream for More". In 2006, she released Alive which contained "Je t'adore", the song for her performance on the 2006 Eurovision Song Contest. In 2009 she released a concept album, French Connection, which contained her greatest hits.

Released songs

References

External links 
 
 
 Kate Ryan at Hitparade

Ryan, Ryan